Firelord may refer to:

Firelord (comics), a Marvel Comics superhero
Firelord (novel), an Arthurian historical novel by Parke Godwin
Firelord (video game), a 1986 action-adventure game
Firelord Ozai, a character from Avatar: The Last Airbender